Udhra ibn Abd Allah al-Fihrí was a fleeting Umayyad governor of Al Andalus in 726. He may have been chosen by Anbasa to succeed him as governor, but his term lasted no more than six months until he completed the task of withdrawing the troops Anbasa had commanded during his last campaign in Gaul.

See also
Timeline of the Muslim presence in the Iberian peninsula

References

8th-century rulers in Europe
Umayyad governors of Al-Andalus
8th-century Arabs